The Hampden–Sydney Tigers are the athletic teams that represent Hampden–Sydney College, located in Hampden Sydney, Virginia, in NCAA Division III intercollegiate sports. The Tigers compete as members of the Old Dominion Athletic Conference for all sports. The Tigers were one of the founding members of the ODAC in 1976. Hampden–Sydney sponsors 9 sporting activities for its male students.

History
Hampden–Sydney's rivalry with Randolph–Macon College is one of the longest-running college rivalries in the United States. "The Game" is often referred to as the oldest small-school football rivalry in the South, with the first match up having been played in 1893. Athletic events involving the two schools are fiercely competitive, and the week prior to "The Game" between Hampden–Sydney and Randolph-Macon is known as "Beat Macon Week".

Varsity teams

List of teams
Men's sports
 Baseball
 Basketball
 Cross Country
 Football
 Golf
 Lacrosse
 Soccer
 Swimming and diving
 Tennis

Individual teams

Football

References

External links